The Universal Hospital Tirana is a 120-bed hospital on Kavajë Street in western Tirana, Albania, offering medical services. Services are available 24 hours per day, 7 days per week. Universal Hospital Tirana is one of the largest and the most comprehensive private hospitals in the country.
The hospital belongs to Ege Saglik Tesisleri ve Egitim Muesseseleri AS, a Turkish company based in Izmir/Turkey and the majority shareholder of this company is Universal Saglik Yatirimlari Holding, again a Turkish company based in Istanbul/Turkey and chaired by Azmi Ofluoglu.

Universal Tirana has a main hospital building which houses all inpatient facilities such as patient rooms, two catheterization laboratories, 5 surgical operating suites, intensive care, emergency services, nursery and neonatology, and labor and delivery. The main building also has outpatient services such as the Clinical Laboratory Services, Radiology, and Physical Therapy. The Polyclinic building contains various outpatient services from lasik surgery to dialysis.

Many of the hospital’s features, such as the hand-painted detailing and the vaulted ceiling of the main entrance and reception area, are designed to create a relaxing atmosphere so the patients can feel relaxed and had all of the psychological benefits of being on vacation in a hotel.

Universal Hospital Tirana's Clinical Laboratory has the capacity to serve over 500 patients per day and produce 10,000 analyses per day using the equipment from around the world. The lab is also a reference lab, which operates at international standards.

References
Facebook page of UHT
Official Website of Universal Hospital Tirana
Inauguration of Hospital Article from Lajme Shqiperia in Albanian
Inauguration of Hospital Article from NOA in Albanian
Inauguration of Hospital Article from Parajsa in Albanian

Buildings and structures in Tirana
Hospitals in Albania